Richard Portnow (born January 26, 1947) is an American actor known for such films and television series as Good Morning, Vietnam, Barton Fink, Kindergarten Cop, Seven, Ghost Dog: The Way of the Samurai, The Spirit, Law Abiding Citizen, Private Parts, Fallen Arches, Double Down, Poolhall Junkies, Spring Break '83, The Sopranos, Hannah Montana, The Nanny, Trumbo, Oldboy, Find Me Guilty, Underdogs and Boston Legal.

Career

1990s
Portnow played the role of defense attorney Harold "Mel" Melvoin on the Emmy-winning HBO series The Sopranos (1999), the lawyer for Uncle Junior.

2010s
Portnow appeared in Matthew Charles Santoro's sci-fi film Higher Power, which was released in 2018.

Filmography

Film

Television

Video games

References

External links

1947 births
Living people
People from Brooklyn
Male actors from New York City
American male film actors
American male television actors
Brooklyn College alumni
20th-century American male actors
21st-century American male actors